Rogers Pass may refer to:

Rogers Pass (British Columbia)
Rogers Pass (Montana)
Rogers Pass (Colorado), part of James Peak Wilderness Area